Trial by Jury is a comic opera in one act, with music by Arthur Sullivan and libretto by W. S. Gilbert.

Trial by Jury may also refer to:

Law
Trial by jury or jury trial, a type of legal proceeding

Television
Trial by Jury (TV series), a 1989-90 scripted television court show
Trial by Jury (film), a 1994 American thriller film by Heywood Gould
Law & Order: Trial by Jury, an American television drama

Postmodern art
 Trial by Jury (painting)  or Laying Down the Law, an 1840 oil-on-canvas painting by Sir Edwin Landseer